Bertalan Bicskei (17 September 1944 – 16 July 2011) was a Hungarian football goalkeeper and manager.

Playing career 
As a youth player, he played for the most famous Hungarian club side, Ferencváros, and he also honed his skills in Honved and MTK Budapest, both Premier Division Hungarian sides. As a goalkeeper of great talent, he played many games for the Hungary National Youth Team, as well as the 13 and Senior National Team. After his playing days were over, he devoted much of his time to coaching and teaching young soccer players on the highest level.

Managerial career 
From 1977 to 1982, he worked as the coaching director for the MTK Budapest's youth programme, and from 1982 to 1986 he was the Youth Coach Director for the Hungarian national football team. As one of his greatest achievements on that level, under his coaching and guidance, the Under-18 National Team of Hungary, captured the European Youth Championship in Moscow, in 1984.

Before moving on to the senior level, Bicskei successfully completed the, work, and graduated at the world-renowned soccer academy in Cologne, Germany in 1986. He is one of just a few Hungarian-born coaches who was able to earn one of the most respected coaching diplomas in the world. While in Germany, he also studied philosophy, and learned to speak excellent German.

In 1987/88 Bicskei become head coach of Honvéd Budapest, (that year, Honvéd won the National title and the Hungarian cup) and his professional career was off to a flying start. In 1989, he, was selected to coach the senior national team of Hungary. In 1991, he could not refuse a challenging offer from South Korea and he became a head coach of Daewoo Royals.  Under his direction, the club won the 1991 national title and he was voted, Manager of the Year in South Korea.  From 1992 to 1994 he coached club FC Luzern in Switzerland. In the 1995/96 he returned home briefly to coach MTK Budapest.

Bicskei packed his suitcase again in 1995, this time to Saudi Arabia where he coached Al Raed FC in the 1995/96 seasons. During his stay in Saudi Arabia, he started working on his book, "Preparation of Young Footballs", a soccer achievement that not only complements, but also challenges everything that was written thus far on teaching young soccer players to achieve the highest level. After returning home, he coached Honvéd Budapest once again, 1996/97 seasons, and he was technical director at RABA ETO Győr in the 1998/99 seasons.

Between 1998 and 2001 he served his second stint as the national coach of Hungary, later becoming the technical director of the Hungarian Football Federation between 2006 and mid-2008.

In the second half of 2004, the Football Association of Malaysia selected Bertalan Bicskei, to succeed Allan Harris. Bicskei led the national side to third place at the regional Tiger Cup competition, but was demoted to youth development duties by FAM for his actions during a friendly against Singapore in Penang on 8 June 2005. Bicskei, disgusted by the standard of officiating, threw a bottle onto the pitch before confronting a Singapore player. In September 2005 the contract was terminated after mutual agreement.

Bicskei was given the job of Liberia's national coach in July 2010 on a four-year contract, but had to take a leave of absence in February 2011 after being poisoned in Liberia.

Death
On 16 July 2011, Bicskei died in Budapest after a long battle with illness. He was 67 years old. The death of Bicskei was described as a loss to "a very important part of Hungarian football".

References

1944 births
2011 deaths
Footballers from Budapest
Hungarian footballers
Hungary international footballers
Association football goalkeepers
Veszprém LC footballers
Budapest Honvéd FC players
Újpest FC players
Hungarian football managers
Hungarian expatriate football managers
Budapest Honvéd FC managers
Hungary national football team managers
Hungarian expatriate sportspeople in South Korea
Busan IPark managers
Hungarian expatriate sportspeople in Switzerland
FC Luzern managers
Expatriate football managers in Egypt
Hungarian expatriate sportspeople in Egypt
Al Masry SC managers
MTK Budapest FC managers
Hungarian expatriate sportspeople in Saudi Arabia
Al-Riyadh SC managers
Expatriate football managers in Singapore
Hungarian expatriate sportspeople in Singapore
Sengkang Punggol FC managers
Fehérvár FC managers
Expatriate football managers in Malaysia
Malaysia national football team managers
Hungarian expatriate sportspeople in Malaysia
Újpest FC managers
Expatriate football managers in Liberia
Liberia national football team managers
Expatriate football managers in Saudi Arabia
Expatriate football managers in South Korea
Expatriate football managers in Switzerland
Nemzeti Bajnokság I managers
Hungarian expatriate sportspeople in Liberia